This article is about the particular significance of the year 1869 to Wales and its people.

Incumbents

Lord Lieutenant of Anglesey – Henry Paget, 2nd Marquess of Anglesey (until 7 February); William Owen Stanley (from 2 March) 
Lord Lieutenant of Brecknockshire – Charles Morgan, 1st Baron Tredegar
Lord Lieutenant of Caernarvonshire – Edward Douglas-Pennant, 1st Baron Penrhyn 
Lord Lieutenant of Cardiganshire – Edward Pryse
Lord Lieutenant of Carmarthenshire – John Campbell, 2nd Earl Cawdor 
Lord Lieutenant of Denbighshire – Robert Myddelton Biddulph    
Lord Lieutenant of Flintshire – Sir Stephen Glynne, 9th Baronet 
Lord Lieutenant of Glamorgan – Christopher Rice Mansel Talbot 
Lord Lieutenant of Merionethshire – Edward Lloyd-Mostyn, 2nd Baron Mostyn
Lord Lieutenant of Monmouthshire – Henry Somerset, 8th Duke of Beaufort
Lord Lieutenant of Montgomeryshire – Sudeley Hanbury-Tracy, 3rd Baron Sudeley
Lord Lieutenant of Pembrokeshire – William Edwardes, 3rd Baron Kensington
Lord Lieutenant of Radnorshire – John Walsh, 1st Baron Ormathwaite

Bishop of Bangor – James Colquhoun Campbell
Bishop of Llandaff – Alfred Ollivant 
Bishop of St Asaph – Thomas Vowler Short 
Bishop of St Davids – Connop Thirlwall

Events
January
Henry Austin Bruce becomes MP for Renfrewshire.
Timothy Richards Lewis goes to India to study cholera.
1 May – The Western Mail is published for the first time.
19 May – Two days after John Young, the English manager of the Leeswood Green colliery, announces a pay cut, he is attacked by some of his workers.
2 June – Seven men are tried at Mold for attacking John Young.  A riot breaks out as those convicted are being transported to the railway station; soldiers fire on the crowd, killing four people.
10 June
53 men and boys are killed in the second underground explosion within two years at Ferndale Colliery in the Rhondda.
Three people are killed in a train derailment at Maesycwmmer in Glamorgan.
August – Anti-Irish riots at Pontlottyn in the Rhymney Valley result in one death.
1 September – The Dyserth branch line is opened for goods traffic.
30 October – The first edition of the Welsh-language periodical Y Goleuad is published.
unknown date
Landore steelworks at Swansea established by Carl Wilhelm Siemens.
John Hughes of Merthyr Tydfil buys land near the Sea of Azov, where he develops an ironworks and founds the city of Yuzovka (later Donetsk).
Joseph Leycester Lyne (Father Ignatius of Jesus) acquires land at Capel-y-ffin and begins construction of an Anglican Benedictine community, Llanthony Abbey.
Construction of the fort at St Catherine's Island, off Tenby.
Prehistoric burial remains are discovered at Parc le Breos on the Gower Peninsula.
John Owen of Tyn-llwyn is evicted from his farm for voting Tory.

Arts and literature

Awards
The first official National Eisteddfod of Wales takes place at Holywell.

New books
J. H. Clark – History of Monmouthshire
John Hugh Evans – 
Jane Hughes – 
David Watkin Jones 
Nathaniel Jones 
John Petherick – Travels in Central Africa and Explorations of the Western Nile Tributaries
William Rowlands –  (Bibliography of the Welsh) (posthumous; ed. Daniel Silvan Evans)
Jane Williams (Ysgafell) – A History of Wales derived from Authentic Sources
Robert Williams (Trebor Mai) –

Music
Owen Jones –  (collection of hymns)

Sport
Football – Ruabon footballers set up a club at Plas Madoc.
Mountaineering – Emmeline Lewis Lloyd attempts an ascent of the Matterhorn.

Births
11 January – Ralph Sweet-Escott, English born, Wales rugby international (died 1907)
9 April – John Hugh Edwards, politician (died 1945)
19 May – John Henry Williams, Welsh politician (died 1936)
20 May – Robert Griffith Berry, minister and writer (died 1945)
12 August – Fred Parfitt, Wales international rugby player (died 1953)
6 September – Walford Davies, composer (died 1944)
24 September – Maud Cunnington, archaeologist (died 1951)
29 October – Bill Morris, Wales international rugby player (died 1946)
15 November – Percy Bennett, Wales international rugby player (died 1936)
20 November – Herbert Tudor Buckland, architect working in Birmingham (died 1951)

Deaths
23 March – William Williams (Caledfryn), poet, 68
31 March – David Rees (Y Cynhyrfwr), Nonconformist leader and author, 67
16 April – James Davies (Iago ap Dewi), poet, 68
1 July – David Jones, banker and politician, 58
14 July – Lloyd Kenyon, 3rd Baron Kenyon, 64
26 August – William Williams (Creuddynfab), 55
October – John Jones (Talhaiarn), poet, 59 (suicide)
7 October – George Rice-Trevor, 4th Baron Dynevor, politician, 74 
9 November – Harriet Windsor-Clive, 13th Baroness Windsor, philanthropist,
15 December – David Williams, politician, 70
17 December – Sarah Jacob, "the fasting girl", 12

References

Wales